is the fifth entry in the Tales of the World series, and the second entry in the Radiant Mythology series. Like other games in the series, it features a group of characters from various Tales games. Fifty characters from the series make an appearance. The theme song, flyaway, is performed by Back-On. It was released exclusively in Japan on January 29, 2009.

Characters

Original Characters
Kanonno Earhart
Panille
Shoh Corron
Niata
Janis
Goede
Genesis Llobrera

Series Characters
Characters marked in BOLD are new to Tales of the World: Radiant Mythology 2

Tales of Phantasia
Cress Albane
Mint Adenade
Chester Burklight
Arche Klein
Suzu Fujibayashi

Tales of Destiny
Stahn Aileron
Rutee Katrea
Leon Magnus
Philia Felice
Woodrow Kelvin
Mighty Kongman
Lilith Aileron

Tales of Eternia
Reid Hershel
Farah Oersted
Keele Zeibel
Chat
Celsius

Tales of Destiny 2
Kyle Dunamis
Reala
Nanaly Fletch
Harold Berselius

Tales of Symphonia
Lloyd Irving
Colette Brunel
Kratos Aurion
Genis Sage
Raine Sage
Presea Combatir
Zelos Wilder

Tales of Rebirth
Veigue Lungberg
Mao Orselg
Eugene Gallardo
Annie Barrs

Tales of Legendia
Senel Coolidge
Chloe Valens

Tales of the Abyss
Luke fon Fabre
Tear Grants
Guy Cecil
Jade Curtiss
Anise Tatlin
Asch

Tales of the Tempest
Caius Qualls
Rubia Natwick

Tales of Innocence
Ruca Milda
Illia Animi
Spada Belforma

Tales of Vesperia
Yuri Lowell
Estellise Sidos Heurassein

Character Classes
Those marked in BOLD are new to Tales of the World: Radiant Mythology 2.

Warrior - Has high physical strength and excels in close-range combat.
Thief - Uses quick dagger attacks, giving enemies little chance to counter.
Mage - Uses offensive magic spells for dealing damage.
Priest - Specializes in healing and support magic.
Swordsman - Has a variety of strong and quick sword attacks.
Fighter - Uses fast and power attacks based on martial arts.
Hunter - Excels in attacking enemies from a distance with a bow.
Ninja - Utilizes quickness and trickery to defeat enemies.
Bishop - Uses stronger offensive spells with some healing/support magic.
Magic Knight - Adept at both physical attacks and magic spells.
Dual Swordsman - Uses two swords to increase close-range damage and attack speed.
Great Swordsman - Uses one, large sword. Slow, but extremely powerful.
Pirate - Adept at both close and ranged combat with a dagger and pistol.
Monk - A Stronger version of the Fighter that uses healing spells.
Paladin - Also uses a large sword, but has healing spells.

Reception
On release, Famitsu magazine scored the game a 32 out of 40.

Radiant Mythology 2 ranked first in sales between January 26 and February 22 of 2009 at 288,860 copies sold. By the end of 2009, Radiant Mythology 2 sold a total of 339,523 copies and was the 25th best-selling game in Japan of 2009.

References

External links
 Official Site 

Role-playing video games
Action role-playing video games
Alfa System games
Japan-exclusive video games
PlayStation Portable games
PlayStation Portable-only games
World: Radiant Mythology 2, Tales of the
Video games developed in Japan
Video games scored by Go Shiina
Video games scored by Motoi Sakuraba
Video games featuring protagonists of selectable gender
2009 video games